In enzymology, an isobutyryl-CoA mutase is an enzyme that catalyzes the chemical reaction

2-methylpropanoyl-CoA  butanoyl-CoA

Hence, this enzyme has one substrate, 2-methylpropanoyl-CoA, and one product, butanoyl-CoA.

This enzyme belongs to the family of isomerases, specifically those intramolecular transferases transferring other groups.  The systematic name of this enzyme class is 2-methylpropanoyl-CoA CoA-carbonylmutase. Other names in common use include isobutyryl coenzyme A mutase, and butyryl-CoA:isobutyryl-CoA mutase.  It uses adenosylcobalamin as a cofactor, which is bound at the enzyme's vitamin B12-binding domain. The mechanism of action of the enzyme is to generate a 5′-deoxyadenosyl radical by homolytic cleavage of the cobalt-carbon bond of the cofactor. This radical abstracts a hydrogen atom from the substrate to initiate the rearrangement reaction.

References 

 
 

EC 5.4.99
Cobalt enzymes
Enzymes of unknown structure